The Roman Catholic Diocese of Valdivia is a Latin rite suffragan diocese in the Ecclesiastical province of Concepción in Chile.

Its cathedral episcopal see is Catedral Nuestra Señora del Rosario, dedicated to Our Lady of the Rosary, in the city of Valdivia, Los Ríos.

History 
 14 June 1910: Established as Mission “sui iuris” of Valdivia, on territory split off from the Diocese of San Carlos de Ancud
 25 September 1924: Promoted as Apostolic Administration of Valdivia
 8 July 1944: Promoted as Diocese of Valdivia
 Lost territory on 1955.11.15 to establish the Diocese of Osorno

Statistics 
As per 2014, it pastorally served 145,500 Catholics (47.2% of 308,000 total) on 13,679 km² in 17 parishes with 27 priests (10 diocesan, 17 religious), 28 deacons, 60 lay religious (18 brothers, 42 sisters) and 2 seminarians

Ordinaries 
(all Roman rite)
Ecclesiastical Superior of the independent mission 
 Augusto Klinke Leier (1910.06.19 – 1924.09.25)

 BIOS TO ELABORATE
permanent Apostolic Administrators of Valdivia 
 Apostolic Administrator ad nutum Sanctae Sedis Augusto Klinke Leier (1924.09.25 – 1928.11.14)
 Teodoro Eugenín Barrientos, Picpus Fathers (SS.CC. ) (1931.04.10 – 1942.06.20)

Suffragan Bishops of Valdivia 
 Arturo Mery Beckdorf (1944.07.29 – 1955.04.20), appointed Coadjutor Archbishop of Concepción (Santissima Concezione)
 José Manuel Santos Ascarza, Teresian Carmelites (O.C.D. ) (1955.09.21 – 1983.05.03)
 Alejandro Jiménez Lafeble (1983.12.12 – 1996.02.29)
 Apostolic Administrator Sergio Otoniel Contreras Navia (1995.04.29 – 1996.09.08)
 Ricardo Ezzati Andrello, Salesians (S.D.B. ) (1996.06.28 – 2001.07.10)
 Ignacio Francisco Ducasse Medina (2002.05.31 – 8 June 2017)
 Apostolic Administrator Fr. Gonzalo Espina Peruyero (26 August 2017 - 23 December 2020)
 Santiago Jaime Silva Retamales (23 December 2020 - )

See also 
 List of Catholic dioceses in Chile

Sources and external links 
 GCatholic.org – data for all sections
 Diocese website
 Catholic Hierarchy

Roman Catholic dioceses in Chile
Roman Catholic Ecclesiastical Province of Concepción
Los Ríos Region
Roman Catholic dioceses and prelatures established in the 20th century
Religious organizations established in 1910
1910 establishments in Chile